Velimir Jovanović (born 25 August 1987) is a Serbian professional footballer who plays for German club Greifswalder FC, as a  striker.

Career
Born in Niš, Jovanović has played club football in Germany for TSG Neustrelitz, Energie Cottbus II, Energie Cottbus, Carl Zeiss Jena and 1. FC Magdeburg.

References

 Velimir Jovanovic wechselt zum TSV Steinbach, fupa.net, 6 January 2016

External links
 

1987 births
Living people
Sportspeople from Niš
Serbian footballers
Association football forwards
2. Bundesliga players
3. Liga players
Regionalliga players
FC Sachsen Leipzig players
TSG Neustrelitz players
FC Energie Cottbus players
FC Energie Cottbus II players
FC Carl Zeiss Jena players
1. FC Magdeburg players
TSV Steinbach Haiger players
FC Rot-Weiß Erfurt players
Serbian expatriate footballers
Serbian expatriate sportspeople in Germany
Expatriate footballers in Germany
1. FC Neubrandenburg 04 players